Therrian Jamaal Fontenot (born June 20, 1982) is a former professional American and Canadian football cornerback. He was signed by the Buffalo Bills as an undrafted free agent in 2005. He played college football at Fresno State.

Fontenot was also a member of the Green Bay Packers, Cleveland Browns, Philadelphia Eagles and Edmonton Eskimos.

External links

Philadelphia Eagles bio (2008)
Fresno State bio

1982 births
Living people
Players of American football from California
American football cornerbacks
Canadian football defensive backs
American players of Canadian football
Fresno State Bulldogs football players
Buffalo Bills players
Green Bay Packers players
Rhein Fire players
Cleveland Browns players
Philadelphia Eagles players
Edmonton Elks players
Sportspeople from Los Angeles County, California
People from Pineville, Louisiana
Players of American football from Louisiana
Sportspeople from Rapides Parish, Louisiana